No Jive is the eighteenth studio album by the Scottish hard rock band Nazareth, released in 1991.
This album marked the return of guitarist Billy Rankin as a replacement for departing guitarist Manny Charlton.

Track listing

This Flight Tonight is bonus track for all CDs and some cassette editions.

2002 30th Anniversary Bonus Tracks

Personnel
Nazareth
Dan McCafferty - vocals
Billy Rankin - guitars
Pete Agnew - bass guitar
Darrell Sweet - drums, percussion

Other credits
Peter Bizarre - keyboards
Roland Peil - percussion
Engineered by Ian Remmer
Executive Producers - Micky Berresheim & Alfie Falckenbach
Mixed by Mike Ging
Sleeve design & artwork - Eric Philippe

Chart performance

References 

Nazareth (band) albums
1991 albums